Xyroptila vaughani is a moth of the family Pterophoridae. The species was described by Thomas Bainbrigge Fletcher in 1909. It is found in Sri Lanka and India.

The larvae probably feed on the fruit of Dimorphocalyx glabellus.

References

Moths described in 1909
vaughani
Moths of Asia